Whitway is a hamlet in the civil parish of Burghclere in the Basingstoke and Deane district of Hampshire, England. Its nearest town is Newbury, which lies approximately 5 miles (8.1 km) north from the hamlet.

Villages in Hampshire